Keijo Pehkonen (born 11 November 1964) is a Finnish wrestler. He competed at the 1988 Summer Olympics and the 1992 Summer Olympics.

References

External links
 

1964 births
Living people
Finnish male sport wrestlers
Olympic wrestlers of Finland
Wrestlers at the 1988 Summer Olympics
Wrestlers at the 1992 Summer Olympics
People from Heinola
Sportspeople from Päijät-Häme
World Wrestling Championships medalists